Yamoransa is a  small town 
near Cape Coast in the Central Region of Ghana It lies along the main international road that connects Kumasi-Cape Coast or (Burkina Faso-Ivory Coast) and Accra-Cape Coast or (Togo-Ivory Coast). It is a developing community with different economic activities. Notable of these is the kenkey(a food prepared from corn) and bread trades by most of the women of the community mostly around their main Lorry Station. The community has about 5 private and 3 public basic schools with 1 Private Senior High School and 1 Vocational School.
Yamoransa Kojokrom enstools Chief and Sumankwahene of Nkusukum Area ,Nana Mensah III on the 19th February 2022

References

Yamoransa Kojokrom enstools Nana Mensah III as Chief and Sumankwahene of Nkusukum Traditional Area (19/02/22)

See also

Populated places in the Central Region (Ghana)